William Peter Fortune (October 14, 1897 – March 12, 1947) was an American football player.   He played guard and tackle for the Michigan Wolverines football team from 1917 to 1919. He was a member of the 1918 Michigan Wolverines football team that finished the season undefeated and has been recognized as the national championship team of 1918. He later played professional football for the Chicago Cardinals in 1920 and the Hammond Pros from 1924 to 1925.

See also
1917 Michigan Wolverines football team
1918 Michigan Wolverines football team
1919 Michigan Wolverines football team

References

External links

1897 births
1947 deaths
Sportspeople from Joliet, Illinois
Players of American football from Illinois
American football guards
American football tackles
Michigan Wolverines football players
Chicago Cardinals players
Hammond Pros players